Melovatka is a rural locality (a selo) in Nizhnevedugskoye Rural Settlement, Semiluksky District, Voronezh Oblast, Russia. The population was 349 as of 2010. There are 9 streets.

Geography 
Melovatka is located 47 km northwest of Semiluki (the district's administrative centre) by road. Staraya Olshanka is the nearest rural locality.

References 

Rural localities in Semiluksky District